Pseudotrapelus neumanni,  Neumann's agama, is a species of Agama native to Yemen and Saudi Arabia.

References 

Reptiles described in 1905
neumanni
Taxa named by Gustav Tornier]